The 2022 Forlì Open was a professional tennis tournament played on clay courts. It was the inaugural edition of the tournament which was part of the 2022 ATP Challenger Tour. It took place in Forlì, Italy between 30 May and 5 June 2022.

Champions

Singles

 Lorenzo Musetti def.  Francesco Passaro 2–6, 6–3, 6–2.

Doubles

  Nicolás Barrientos /  Miguel Ángel Reyes-Varela def.  Sadio Doumbia /  Fabien Reboul 7–5, 4–6, [10–4].

Singles main-draw entrants

Seeds

 1 Rankings as of 23 May 2021.

Other entrants
The following players received wildcards into the singles main draw:
  Borna Ćorić
  Lorenzo Musetti
  Stefano Napolitano

The following player received entry into the singles main draw as a special exempt:
  Andrea Pellegrino

The following players received entry into the singles main draw as alternates:
  Riccardo Bonadio
  Andrea Collarini

The following players received entry from the qualifying draw:
  Kimmer Coppejans
  Arthur Fils
  Matteo Gigante
  Robin Haase
  Matteo Martineau
  Francesco Passaro

The following player received entry as a lucky loser:
  Ernests Gulbis

References

Forlì Open
Forlì Open
Forlì Open
May 2022 sports events in Italy
June 2022 sports events in Italy